Ralph Faulkner (July 20, 1891 – January 28, 1987) was an American fencer and film actor. He competed in the team sabre event at the 1932 Summer Olympics.

Post-college career
After graduating from college Faulkner became a forest ranger. The majority of his time was spent in the wilderness of Washington (state). He then moved to New York, where he established himself as a stage performer and silent film actor.

Introduction to fencing
During the filming of the 1922 film The Man from Glengarry, in which he portrayed a lumberjack, Faulkner fell and broke his left knee. Faulkner underwent surgery and move to Los Angeles. It was here he joined the Los Angeles Athletic Club and took up fencing as a way of recovering. Faulkner reportedly fenced for 50 hours a week until his knee had healed completely. After which, he began competing in organized amateur fencing tournaments around Southern California where he got the opportunity to learn from many accomplished fencers, including Lucien Gaudin, Philippe Cattiau, Oreste Puliti, and Roger Ducret. During this time in his life, Faulkner was making a living selling real estate.

International fencing career
Faulkner won his first major sabre championship in 1928 and went on to compete in the 1928 Summer Olympics and the 1932 Summer Olympics. In the 1932 Los Angeles games the United States took fourth place in team sabre. It was the highest finish in the nation's history.

Coaching
Faulkner opened Falcon Studios, a theatre and fencing school with his wife, Edith Jane. He coached many notable actors and actresses for staged swordplay and, himself returned to film in the mid 1930s. Additionally, Faulkner trained a number of fencers for competition including Polly Craus, Sewall Shurtz, and Janice Romary. He taught a classical French style which stressed form, bladework, and finger strength over agility and athleticism, characteristic of the Italian school. Eventually, he retired from film work but continued to teach all three weapons until he suffered a stroke following a Saturday fencing class. He died two weeks later on January 27, 1987, at the age of 95.

Partial filmography

 War and the Woman (1917) - Minor Role
 On the Jump (1918) - Woodrow Wilson
 The Prussian Cur (1918) - Woodrow Wilson
 Why America Will Win (1918) - Woodrow Wilson
 Anne of Little Smoky (1921) - Tom Brockton
 Hope (1922, Short) - Pierre
 The Man from Glengarry (1922)
 April Showers (1923) - Champ Sullivan
 Loving Lies (1924) - Jack Ellis
 My Neighbor's Wife (1925) - William Jordan
 God of Mankind (1928)
 The Three Musketeers (1935) - Jussac (uncredited)
 The Prisoner of Zenda (1937) - Bersonin (uncredited)
 If I Were King (1938) - First Watch (uncredited)
 Dramatic School (1938) - Fencing Teacher (uncredited)
 The Star Maker (1939) - Fencing Master
 Zorro's Fighting Legion (1939, Serial) - Rodriguez - Henchman [Ch. 1] (uncredited)
 The Foxes of Harrow (1947) - Fencing Instructor (uncredited)
 Fireside Theatre (1953, TV Series) - Professor
 The Purple Mask (1955) - Opponent (uncredited)
 The Dinah Shore Show (1956, TV Series) - Himself
 The Ford Television Theatre (1957, TV Series) - Nourric
 Maverick (1958, TV Series) - Herr Ziegler
 Father Knows Best (1960) - Instructor
 Shirley Temple's Storybook (1961, TV Series) - Pirate

References

External links
 
 

1891 births
1987 deaths
American male sabre fencers
American male film actors
Olympic fencers of the United States
Fencers at the 1932 Summer Olympics
People from Abilene, Kansas
Male actors from Kansas
20th-century American male actors